Fort Forman (also spelled Furman or Foreman) was a stockade fort erected by Captain William Foreman at the beginning of the French and Indian War situated three miles north of Romney on the South Branch Potomac River near Vance on West Virginia Route 28.  Fort Furman was in use from its construction in 1755 until 1764.

Later, from Hampshire County in 1777, William Foreman led a company to the Ohio River for the relief of Fort Henry at Wheeling. Forman’s party fell into an ambuscade by Native Americans at "McMechen Narrows" on the Ohio near Moundsville. Twenty-one of the Virginians were killed at the first fire and several men were badly wounded. This ambuscade is known as "Foreman’s Defeat."

See also
List of historic sites in Hampshire County, West Virginia

References

External links
Historic Hampshire "Foreman's Defeat" Article
William H. Ansel's Article on Fort Forman

Forts in Hampshire County, West Virginia
Landmarks in West Virginia
Forman
Colonial forts in West Virginia